Tzeni Karezi (12 January 1932 – 26 July 1992); also known as Jenny Karezi, was a Greek film and stage actress.

Biography

Early life
Evgenia Karpouzi was born in Athens, Greece, to a mathematician father and high school teacher mother. She studied under the direction of the Sisters of St Joseph at a private French school in Thessaloniki, and later by the same Order in Athens. She learned French fluently. When she was a teenager, her father left the family and she continued to live with her mother. Her father died in a car accident in 1971.

In 1951 she was accepted at the Greek National Theater (Εθνικό Θέατρο), where she studied in the Drama School. The playwright Angelos Terzakis and the director Dimitris Rontiris were among her teachers. Upon graduation, in 1954, she was immediately thrust into starring roles in the theatre, playing alongside actors such as Alexis Minotis and Katina Paxinou.

Career
Her stage debut was in the Marika Kotopouli theatre in the French comedy, La belle Heléne, with Melina Mercouri and Vasilis Diamantopoulos. In 1955, Karezi made her cinema debut in the Alekos Sakellarios' comedy, Laterna, ftoheia kai filotimo in 1955, a massive success just like its sequel, Laterna, ftoheia kai garyfallo in 1957. For the soundtrack of the 1959 film To nisi ton genneon she recorded a song by future Academy Award-winner Manos Hadjidakis, "Min ton rotas ton ourano" ("Do not ask the sky").

Her career flourished in the 1960s, when she headed her own theater troupe in 1961 and starred in some of the most classic movies of the Greek cinema, like Lola (1964), Mia trelli ... trelli oikogeneia (1965), Tzeni-Tzeni (1966), and Kontserto gia polyvola (1967). Her greatest film success was Ta kokkina fanaria (The Red Lanterns; 1963), which was nominated for the Academy Award for Best Foreign Language Film.

Her last film appearance was in Aristophanes' Lysistrata (1972). Over the following decade, she continued to produce and star in such stage classics as Who's Afraid of Virginia Woolf?, Medea and Electra. She appeared for the last time in theatre in 1990 in Loula Anagnostaki's play, Diamonds and the blues; suffering from terminal breast cancer, she was in great pain and had to leave the show.

Personal life
In May 1962 Karezi wed a journalist, Zahos Hadjifotiou, but this marriage ended in divorce two years later. In 1967, during the filming of Kontserto gia polyvola, she met Kostas Kazakos, with whom she had her only child, Konstantinos Kazakos, who became also an actor. They formed a popular duo and Karezi's repertoire shifted to more sophisticated and intellectual plays. They were led to prison where they spent several nights due to the play To megalo mas tsirko (Our Big Circus) in 1973, which insulted the Greek junta.

Death
Tzeni Karezi died on 26 July 1992 from cancer at her home and buried at public expense. She was believed to be 58 years old, although some sources gave her age as 56 or 60. Thousands were present to attend her funeral.

As a victim of metastatic cancer, she asked those close to her to make palliative care better known and to assist in its development so others suffering painful diseases or ailments would be able to live their last days with dignity. The Jenny Karezi Foundation is a non-profit Cancer Pain Relief and Palliative Care organization, founded in 1992, in memory of the Greek actress. The Foundation’s mission is to relieve patients with cancer and other chronic diseases, through medical and psychological support.

Filmography

References

External links

 

1930s births
1992 deaths
Age controversies
Greek film actresses
Greek stage actresses
Actresses from Athens
Deaths from breast cancer
Deaths from cancer in Greece
20th-century Greek actresses
Burials at the First Cemetery of Athens